Dennis Parlato (born March 30, 1947 in Los Angeles) is an American dancer, actor, and singer.

Early life and education
He is the son of Charlie Parlato, and the uncle of Grammy-nominated jazz singer Gretchen Parlato. Parlato taught high school English in San Francisco before realizing he wanted to perform. He was performing in chamber concert groups and teaching full-time. While on vacation with his first wife, they decided to see the ballet nearby just as something to do. He went to the Nederlands Dans Theater, a premier theatre company that, unbeknownst to him, was putting on a ballet of Carmina Burana. After watching the ballet, it inspired him when he got back home to switch to half-time teaching and study ballet. He met Austin Tichenor (of Reduced Shakespeare Company) when Parlato joined the Metropolitan Ballet of Oakland (not the Oakland Ballet) as a featured solo dancer and Tichenor was stage manager.

He moved to New York when he was thirty years old. His fiancée at the time Maggie Caponio had a scholarship to the New York City Ballet and he decided to go with her. He auditioned for everything, even though he had no formal vocal or acting lessons. He was cast in A Chorus Line and after that was able to afford proper lessons.

Parlato is probably best known for his work in soap operas where he played Barton Crane on All My Children, Michael Grande on One Life to Live, Clay Alden on Loving and Roger Thorpe on Guiding Light.

Career

Broadway credits
A Chorus Line (1977), understudy
Chess (1988), Walter
Sound of Music (1998), Captain George Von Trapp (replacement)
Dirty Rotten Scoundrels (2005), understudy and Lawrence (replacement)

Off-Broadway/regional credits
Moby Dick (1986), Starbuck
Have I Got a Girl For You! (1986), Igor
Romance/Romance (1986)
The Knife (1987), Dr. Bauer
Shylock (1987),  Antonio
Violent Peace (1990)
Hello Again (1993), The Husband
Down By The Ocean (1994), Dan Bailey
Jack's Holiday (1995), Inspector Thomas Byrnes
Overtime (1996), Antonio
Barefoot Boy with Shoes On (1999)
When We Dead Awaken (2002), Rubek
Guys and Dolls (2004), Sky Masterson
Amazing Grace (2012), Captain Newton

Films
The Dream Team (1989) -- TV newscaster
Johnny Suede (1991) -- Dalton 
Bury the Evidence (1998) -- The Enforcer
Rick (2003) -- BusinessTalk Anchor 
Delirious (2006) -- Royce Ralston
Starting Out in the Evening (2007) -- Author
Bride Wars (2009) -- Dance Instructor

Television
One Life to Live (1988-1990) - Michael Grande
Loving (1992-1995) - Clay Alden #3
Guiding Light (1997-1998) - Roger Thorpe

References

External links
 
 
 Lortel entry

1947 births
Living people
American male soap opera actors
American male stage actors
American male television actors
American male musical theatre actors
Male actors from Los Angeles